Venin (also Romanized as Venīn and Vanīn) is a village in Kachu Rural District, in the Central District of Ardestan County, Isfahan Province, Iran. At the 2006 census, its population was 31, in 12 families.

References 

Populated places in Ardestan County